Mike Tyson's Legends Only League (Legends Only) is a sports league co-founded in 2020 by American former professional boxer Mike Tyson and media executive Sophie Watts. The league provides retired professional athletes the opportunity to compete in their respective sport.

Background
The league was announced in July 2020 with Tyson stating Legends Only "will support athletes in their individual sports, creating some of the most epic competitions, products and live events in the world." Competitions are set to take place across professional sports including American football, soccer, cricket, tennis, baseball, basketball, auto racing and in multiple locations globally. The league events are marked by live and streamed events, docuseries, merchandise, and sponsorships. The League targets longtime fans of retired professional athletes as well as new fans who engage with the historical relevance of the athletes. Events will feature multiple sports competitions and musical acts in addition to the headlining sports event.

The inaugural Legends Only League event aired on November 28 on global pay-per-view with Mike Tyson coming out of retirement to fight Roy Jones Jr. at the Staples Center in Los Angeles in an event titled Frontline Battle. The accompanying docuseries, Frontline Battle, followed Tyson and Jones on their path of mental and physical preparation for the fight. The social media platform Triller served as the main media partner for the event, including handling streaming distribution, and acquiring rights to the miniseries.  Frontline Battle includes undercards Jake Paul vs. Nate Robinson, champion boxers Badou Jack vs. Blake McKernan, and Viddal Riley vs. Rashad Coulter.

Events

References

External links
 

Mike Tyson
Sports leagues established in 2020